In astronomy, limiting magnitude is the faintest apparent magnitude of a celestial body that is detectable or detected by a given instrument.

In some cases, limiting magnitude refers to the upper threshold of detection. In more formal uses, limiting magnitude is specified along with the strength of the signal (e.g., "10th magnitude at 20 sigma"). Sometimes limiting magnitude is qualified by the purpose of the instrument (e.g., "10th magnitude for photometry") This statement recognizes that a photometric detector can detect light far fainter than it can reliably measure.

The limiting magnitude of an instrument is often cited for ideal conditions, but environmental conditions impose further practical limits. These include weather, moonlight, skyglow, and light pollution. The International Dark-Sky Association has been vocal in championing the cause of reducing skyglow and light pollution.

Naked-eye visibility

The limiting magnitude for naked eye visibility refers to the faintest stars that can be seen with the unaided eye near the zenith on clear moonless nights. The quantity is most often used as an overall indicator of sky brightness, in that light polluted and humid areas generally have brighter limiting magnitudes than remote desert or high altitude areas. The limiting magnitude will depend on the observer, and will increase with the eye's dark adaptation. On a relatively clear sky, the limiting visibility will be about 6th magnitude. However, the limiting visibility is 7th magnitude for faint stars visible from dark rural areas located 200 kilometers from major cities.

There is even variation within metropolitan areas. For those who live in the immediate suburbs of New York City, the limiting magnitude might be 4.0. This corresponds to roughly 250 visible stars, or one-tenth the number that can be perceived under perfectly dark skies.  From the New York City boroughs outside Manhattan (Brooklyn, Queens, Staten Island and the Bronx), the limiting magnitude might be 3.0, suggesting that at best, only about 50 stars might be seen at any one time. From brightly lit Midtown Manhattan, the limiting magnitude is possibly 2.0, meaning that from the heart of New York City only approximately 15 stars will be visible at any given time.

From relatively dark suburban areas, the limiting magnitude is frequently closer to 5 or somewhat fainter, but from very remote and clear sites, some amateur astronomers can see nearly as faint as 8th magnitude.  Many basic observing references quote a limiting magnitude of 6, as this is the approximate limit of star maps which date from before the invention of the telescope. Ability in this area, which requires the use of averted vision, varies substantially from observer to observer, with both youth and experience being beneficial.

Limiting magnitude is traditionally estimated by searching for faint stars of known magnitude. In 2013 an app was developed based on Google's Sky Map that allows non-specialists to estimate the limiting magnitude in polluted areas using their phone.

Amateur astronomy

In amateur astronomy, limiting magnitude refers to the faintest objects that can be viewed with a telescope. A two-inch telescope, for example, will gather about 40 times more light than a typical eye, and will allow stars to be seen to about 10th magnitude; a ten-inch (25 cm) telescope will gather about 1000 times as much light as the typical eye, and will see stars down to roughly 14th magnitude, although these magnitudes are very dependent on the observer and the seeing conditions.

Large observatories
Telescopes at large observatories are typically located at sites selected for dark skies.  They also increase the limiting magnitude by using long integration times on the detector, and by using image-processing techniques to increase the signal to noise ratio.  Most 8 to 10 meter class telescopes can detect sources with a visual magnitude of about 27 using a one-hour integration time.

Automated astronomical surveys are often limited to around magnitude 20 because of the short exposure time that allows covering a large part of the sky in a night. In a 30 second exposure the 0.7-meter telescope at the Catalina Sky Survey has a limiting magnitude of 19.5. The Zwicky Transient Facility has a limiting magnitude of 20.5, and Pan-STARRS has a limiting magnitude of 24.

Even higher limiting magnitudes can be achieved for telescopes above the Earth's atmosphere, such as the Hubble Space Telescope, where the sky brightness due to the atmosphere is not relevant.  For orbital telescopes, the background sky brightness is set by the zodiacal light.  The Hubble telescope can detect objects as faint as a magnitude of +31.5, and the James Webb Space Telescope (operating in the infrared spectrum) is expected to exceed that.

See also
Araucaria Project
Night sky
Dark-sky movement

References

External links
Estimating Limiting Magnitude at NinePlanets.org
Telescope Limiting Magnitude Calculator
Loss of the Night app for estimating limiting magnitude
The Astronomical Magnitude Scale

Observational astronomy